DXYJ (92.1 FM), broadcasting as 92.1 Radyo 13, is a radio station. The station's studio and transmitter are located along Jail Rd., Purok 3-A, Brgy. Libertad, Butuan.

The station was formerly known as 107.8 Power FM under the Philippine Information Agency Butuan Chapter from 2011 to 2017.

References

Radio stations in Butuan
Radio stations established in 2011